Vijay Srinivas Karnik is a retired Wing Commander from the Indian Air Force who is known for his leadership during Indo-Pakistani War of 1971. During the war, he was in charge of the Bhuj airbase. During the course of the war, the Bhuj airstrip was destroyed in air strikes in which Pakistani bombers dropped napalm bombs. The Bhuj airport attack has been compared to the Japanese Attack on Pearl Harbor by some. The airfield was raided 35 times in 14 days with attacks by 92 bombs and 22 rockets. Karnik rebuilt Bhuj Airport within 3 days with the help of 300 women from local areas.

Early life
Karnik was born on 6 November 1939 in Nagpur to Srinivas Karnik and Tarabai Karnik.

Air Force Career 
Karnik was commissioned to the Indian Air Force on 26 May 1962. In 1967, he was posted to Pune as a part of the 6 Squadron. During the Indo-Pakistani War of 1971, he was a Squadron Leader posted to the Bhuj Airstrip.

On the 8th of December, 1971, Pakistan launched an aerial attack on the Bhuj airbase and damaged the airstrip by dropping 14 Napalm bombs from the 8 squadrons of Sabre jets. The airstrip needed to be urgently rebuild due to the ongoing war. However, due to a lack of workers at Bhuj, Karnik convinced 300 women from a nearby village of Madhapar for help to rebuild the airstrip. Despite the ongoing bombings by the Pakistani jets, the women were able to complete the repair work in a record 72 hours and the airbase was able to resume its operations. At the end of the war, the then Prime Minister Indira Gandhi, recognised and awarded the contribution of these women.

Karnik was promoted to Wing commander on 1 October 1985.

On 14 October 1986, Karnik retired from service.

In popular culture
In the 2021 Disney+ Hotstar film Bhuj: The Pride of India, Ajay Devgn played the role of Vijay Karnik, set during Indo-Pakistani War of 1971.

References

Indian aviators
Indian Air Force officers
National Defence Academy (India) alumni
1939 births
Living people